Kim Walker (born 14 December 1975) is an Australian field hockey player who competed in the 2008 Summer Olympics.

References

External links
 

1975 births
Living people
Australian female field hockey players
Olympic field hockey players of Australia
Field hockey players at the 2008 Summer Olympics
Commonwealth Games medallists in field hockey
Commonwealth Games gold medallists for Australia
Field hockey players at the 2006 Commonwealth Games
21st-century Australian women
Medallists at the 2006 Commonwealth Games